Abaporu (from Tupi language "",  (man) +  (people) +  (to eat)) is an oil painting on canvas by Brazilian painter Tarsila do Amaral. It was painted as a birthday gift to writer Oswald de Andrade, who was her husband at the time.

It is considered the most valuable painting by a Brazilian artist, having reached the value of $1.4 million, paid by Argentine collector Eduardo Costantini in an auction in 1995. It is currently displayed at the Latin American Art Museum of Buenos Aires (Spanish: Museo de Arte Latinoamericano de Buenos Aires, MALBA) in Buenos Aires, Argentina.

The composition: one man, the sun and a cactus – inspired Oswald de Andrade to write the Manifesto Antropófago and consequently create the Anthropophagic Movement, intended to "swallow" foreign culture and turn it into something culturally Brazilian.

The painting
Tarsila described the subject of the painting as "a monstrous solitary figure, enormous feet, sitting on a green plain, the hand supporting the featherweight minuscule head. In front a cactus exploding in an absurd flower." This "monstrous"  figure is, in fact, human. An unadorned, undressed, sexless, and ageless human whose anatomy has been distorted. Beginning with a huge foot and hand at the bottom of the picture, the figure slowly shrinks to a tiny head at the top.

The background of the painting suggests a natural setting. Here, earth is depicted as a simple small green mound upon which the subject sits. The vegetation is represented  by a cactus at the right of the figure and a golden sun or flower which crowns the composition. The sky is a plain pale blue background.

The style of Abaporu can be traced back to the French modernists, specially Fernand Léger, who taught Tarsila in Paris in 1924. However, the closest resemblance of Abaporu can be found in the Spanish Surrealists, Pablo Picasso and Joan Miró, who also painted a figure with an oversized foot in 1924.

Provenance
After Tarsila's death in 1973, the painting passed to Pietro Maria Bardi's art gallery, who sold it to the art collector Érico Stickel. In 1984 the painting was purchased by the amount of $250,000 by Raul de Souza Dantas Forbes, who then auctioned the painting at Christie's New York City, in 1995.

References

Brazilian paintings
1928 paintings
Modern paintings
Oil on canvas paintings